This is a list of state symbols for the U.S. state of Georgia, as defined in the Official Code of Georgia Annotated or by joint resolutions of the Georgia General Assembly:

Notes

References

External links
 State Symbols page from the Georgia Secretary of State
 State Symbols page from the Digital Library of Georgia

State symbols
Lists of United States state symbols by state